Cohen may refer to:

Places
Cohen-kuhi Tau/4, a star 420 light-years away from Earth in the Taurus Constellation
The Cohen Building of The Judd School in Tonbridge, England

People
 Cohen (surname), a common Jewish surname

Arts, entertainment, and media
Matt Cohen Prize, an award given annually by the Writers' Trust of Canada to a Canadian writer
Shaughnessy Cohen Award, a Canadian literary award

Law
Clinger–Cohen Act, a United States federal law that is designed to improve the way the federal government acquires and manages information technology 
Cohen v. California, a U.S. Supreme Court case dealing with freedom of speech
Cohen v. Cowles Media Co., a U.S. Supreme Court case establishing that freedom of the press does not exempt newspapers from generally applicable laws
Cohens v. Virginia, a U.S. Supreme Court decision most noted for the Marshall Court's assertion of its power to review state supreme court decisions in criminal law matters
Flast v. Cohen, a U.S. Supreme Court case holding that a taxpayer has standing to sue the government to prevent an unconstitutional use of taxpayer funds

Science
Cohen Modal Haplotype, a DNA signature identified with Biblical Aaron, brother of Moses
Cohen–Macaulay ring, a particular type of commutative ring in mathematics
Cohen's kappa, a statistical measure of inter-rater reliability

See also

 Coen (disambiguation)
 Cohan
 Cohn
 Cohon (disambiguation)
 Kagan (disambiguation)
 Kahane
 Kahn
 Kohn
 Kohen, a Jewish priest